The NCAA Woman of the Year Award was created to honor senior female student-athletes who have distinguished themselves throughout their collegiate career in the areas of academic achievement, athletics excellence, service and leadership. Each year, nine finalists are selected from all candidates, three from each division, including Division I, Division II, and Division III. This selection has been given by the National Collegiate Athletic Association since 1991. These finalists represent the finest of all female collegiate athletes.

Woman of the Year Award Honorees

Recipients

 1991 – Mary Beth Riley, Canisius College
 1992 – Catherine Byrne, University of Tennessee
 1993 – Nnenna Lynch, Villanova University
 1994 – Tanya Jones, University of Arizona
 1995 – Rebecca Lobo, University of Connecticut
 1996 – Billie Winsett-Fletcher, University of Nebraska
 1997 – Lisa Coole, University of Georgia
 1998 – Peggy Boutilier, University of Virginia
 1999 – Jamila Demby, University of California, Davis
 2000 – Kristy Kowal, University of Georgia
 2001 – Kimberly A. Black, University of Georgia
 2002 – Tanisha Silas, University of California, Davis
 2003 – Ashley Jo Rowatt Karpinos, Kenyon College
 2004 – Kelly Albin, University of California, Davis
 2005 – Lauryn McCalley, University of Tennessee
 2006 – Annie Bersagel, Wake Forest University
 2007 – Whitney Myers, University of Arizona
 2008 – Nicky Anosike, University of Tennessee
 2009 – Lacey Nymeyer, University of Arizona
 2010 – Justine Schluntz, University of Arizona
 2011 – Laura Barito, Stevens Institute of Technology
 2012 – Elizabeth Phillips, Washington University in St. Louis
 2013 – Ifeatu Okafor, Texas Tech University
 2014 – Elizabeth Tucker, University of Notre Dame
 2015 – Kristin Day, Clarion University of Pennsylvania
 2016 – Margaret Guo, Massachusetts Institute of Technology
 2017 – Lizzy Crist, Washington University in St. Louis
 2018 – Keturah Orji, University of Georgia
 2019 – Angela Mercurio, University of Nebraska
 2020 – Asia Seidt, University of Kentucky
 2021 – Kendall Cornick, Augustana University

2018 Woman of the Year Top-9 Finalists
 Ade Ayoola, University of Chicago 
 Trissy Fairweather, Claflin University
 Delaney Hiegert, Newman University
 Kayla Leland, Whitworth University
 Kami Norton, Angelo State University 
 Keturah Orji, University of Georgia
 Sidney Peters., University of Minnesota 
 Vanessa Shippy, Oklahoma State University 
 Amelia Wilhelm, Bates College

2017 Woman of the Year Top-9 Finalists
 Sabrina Anderson, Slippery Rock University of Pennsylvania 
 Serena Barr, Liberty University
 Jenny Carmichael, University of Oklahoma  
 Eliana Crawford, Kenyon College
 Lizzy Crist, Washington University in St. Louis 
 Karina Martinez, Texas A&M University
 Christina Melian, Stony Brook University 
 Natalie O'Keefe, Southwest Baptist University 
 Jayme Perez, East Texas Baptist University

2016 Woman of the Year Top-9 Finalists
 Margaret Guo, Massachusetts Institute of Technology 
 Christina Hillman, Iowa State University
 Bri Leeper, West Texas A&M University  
 Maurissa Lester, Limestone College
 Kara McCormack, University of Miami 
 Elayna Siebert, Carson-Newman University
 Haley Townsend, Kenyon College 
 Cameasha Turner, University of Texas 
 Ami Viti, Misericordia University

2015 Woman of the Year Top-9 Finalists
 Supriya Davis, Swarthmore College 
 Kristin Day, Clarion University of Pennsylvania
 Margo Geer, University of Arizona  
 Kelsey Graham, Wheaton College
 Margaret MacPhail, DePauw University 
 Colleen Quigley, Florida State University
 Zoe Scandalis, University of Southern California 
 Taylor Skala, Rockhurst University 
 Rebecka Surtevall, Arkansas Tech University

2014 Woman of the Year Top-9 Finalists
 Alexa Baltes, Illinois Wesleyan University 
 Marisa Bast, Northwestern University
 Krista Bellefeuille, University of Northwestern – St. Paul
 Ellen Chambers, Lynn University
 Alyssa Hasslen, University of Arizona 
 Megan Light, Emory University
 Jackie Sileo, Long Island University 
 Elizabeth Tucker, University of Notre Dame 
 Bailey Vrazel, Texas Woman's University

2013 Woman of the Year Top-9 Finalists
 Elena Crosley, Bowdoin College 
 Elizabeth Duffy, Concordia University, St. Paul
 Kaaren Hatlen, Pacific Lutheran University  
 Kelly Majam, University of Hawaii, Manoa
 Alexandra Maseko, Seton Hall University 
 Ifeatu Okafor, Texas Tech University
 Kayla Shull, Clarion University of Pennsylvania 
 Bridgett Soares, Long Island University 
 Lya Swaner, East Texas Baptist University

2012 Woman of the Year Top-9 Finalists
 Hillary Bach, Arizona State University 
 Grace Collins, Barry University
 Kate Griewisch, Lenoir-Rhyne University  
 Kelsey Kittleson, Luther College
 Sarah Jane Otey, U.S. Coast Guard Academy 
 Brooke Pancake, University of Alabama
 Alexi Pappas, Dartmouth College 
 Elizabeth Phillips, Washington University in St. Louis 
 Verena Preikschas, California State University

2011 Woman of the Year Top-9 Finalists
 Laura Barito, Stevens Institute of Technology 
 Danielle Blair, University of Alabama
 Michaela Calnan, Bowdoin College  
 Annie Chandler, University of Arizona
 Hewenfei Elwen Li, Brigham Young University 
 Hayley Emerick, Trinity University
 Victoria Hansen, West Liberty University 
 Grace Johnson, University of Georgia 
 Kelsey Ward, Drury University

2010 Woman of the Year Top-9 Finalists
 Hannah Baker, Wartburg College 
 Lisa Koll, Iowa State University 
 Melissa Mackley, Gustavus Adolphus College 
 Lyndsay McBride, University of Indianapolis 
 Brittany Rogers, University of Alabama
 Justine Schluntz, University of Arizona 
 Mary Slinger, Concordia University 
 Natalja Stanski, Grand Valley State University
 Ruth Westby, Emory University

See also
 List of sports awards honoring women
NCAA Sportsmanship Award (student-athletes who have demonstrated one or more of the ideals of sportsmanship)
Today's Top 10 Award (NCAA) (outstanding senior student-athletes)
Walter Byers Scholarship (NCAA) (top male and female scholar-athletes)
Silver Anniversary Awards (NCAA) (former student-athletes)
Lowe's Senior CLASS Award
Best Female College Athlete ESPY Award
Best Male College Athlete ESPY Award
Athlete of the Year

References

External links
Official site

Woman of the Year Award
Most valuable player awards
College sports trophies and awards in the United States
Student athlete awards in the United States
Women's sports in the United States
Sports awards honoring women
Awards established in 1991
1991 establishments in the United States